This is the complete list of (physical and digital) number-one albums sold in Finland in 2011 according to the Official Finnish Charts composed by Musiikkituottajat – IFPI Finland.

The best-performing album in 2011 in the Finnish charts was Leijonat 2011 – Virallinen Leijonat-kokoelma, the official compilation album by various artists celebrating Finland's victory at the 2011 IIHF World Championship, spending 8 weeks on the top spot. The second-best chart performer was Finnish singer-songwriter Chisu with her third studio album Kun valaistun spending 5 weeks atop the chart. The third-best chart performer was the posthumous Laulaja 1945–2010 by Finnish Kari Tapio (with four weeks atop the chart).

The top-ten list of the best-selling 2011 albums in Finland was the following:

Chart history

See also
 List of number-one singles of 2011 (Finland)

References

Number-one albums
Finland Albums
2011